Gorodetskoye is a rural locality (a selo) in Beketovsky Selsoviet, Yermekeyevsky District, Bashkortostan, Russia. The population was 153 as of 2010. There is 1 street.

Geography 
Gorodetskoye is located 30 km southeast of Yermekeyevo (the district's administrative centre) by road. Imeni 8 Marta is the nearest rural locality.

References 

Rural localities in Yermekeyevsky District